Nicosia Mall is a shopping mall located in the Lakatamia-Anthoupolis area, southwest of the centre of Nicosia, capital of Cyprus. It opened in November 2018 and is the largest mall in Cyprus.

History
Plans for the mall were announced in 2010. Construction of the mall began in 2011 but work was suspended during an economic crisis in 2013. In 2017, Bank of Cyprus supported a €25 million refinancing and restructuring of the Nicosia Mall development, becoming a shareholder in the parent company, NCMH Nicosia Mall Holdings Ltd. The move helped construction resume in 2017, and the project was then completed in 14 months. After it opened on 21 November 2018, it averaged 407,000 visitors a month (3.7 million in total) in the first eight months of 2019. In late 2019, Bank of Cyprus sold its 64% stake in the Nicosia Mall for around €96m to buyers including retailers with stores in the mall.

In early 2020, during the COVID-19 pandemic in Cyprus, Nicosia Mall closed all its stores apart from the Athienitis supermarket, though some stores later operated 'pick-up' services allowing customers to collect online or telephone orders. All shopping malls were closed during the 2020 Christmas period, finally reopening in February 2021.

Facilities
It has  of retail space provided by around 140 outlets ranged over three floor levels, with mostly underground parking for 1,700 cars. It also houses a food market and a six-screen Rio Premier cinema which also offers open air cinema screenings.

Transport access 
Nicosia Mall is situated on the south side of the A9 motorway, northwest of the Anthoupoli interchange. It is connected to the city via four bus routes.

See also 
 Nicosia District
 List of shopping malls in Cyprus

References

External link
 Official website

Shopping malls established in 2018